Caliente is the name of an Sirius XM Radio's Tropical music channel, playing Salsa, Merengue, Bachata and Reggaeton. It is available on 158 (previously channel 95 on Sirius, where it replaced Rumbón on November 12, 2008), and previously channel 85 on XM) and on Dish Network channel 6095, Until February 9, 2010, it was heard on DirecTV channel 869, but all of the Sirius XM music channels were dropped in favor of Sonic Tap by DMX.  Prior to the Sirius/XM merger, Caliente was on XM channel 94, This channel was on Sirius XM Radio 69 and Dish Network 6069 when Escape was online, On November 12, 2015, Escape returned to Sirius XM Radio 69 and Dish Network 6069 and Caliente returned to the Latin lineup.

This channel was programmed by Hispanic Broadcasting Corporation until it merged with Univision Radio in 2002. Univision Radio programmed the channel until 2004 channel production turned in-house.  XM returned the channel to the satellites on 2004-08-02.

Core artists
Shakira
J Balvin
Maluma
Bad Bunny
Daddy Yankee
Prince Royce
Marc Anthony
Romeo Santos
Victor Manuelle
Gilberto Santa Rosa
Carlos Vives

Sirius Satellite Radio channels
XM Satellite Radio channels
Sirius XM Radio channels
Spanish-language radio stations in the United States
Tropical music radio stations
Radio stations established in 2001